Rev. Charles Franklin Thwing (November 9, 1853 – August 29, 1937) was an American clergyman and educator.

Birth
He was born in New Sharon, Maine on November 9, 1853.  He graduated from Harvard University in 1876, and from Andover Theological Seminary in 1879. He then served as a pastor in churches in Cambridge, Massachusetts and Minneapolis, Minnesota.  The Reverend Thwing became president of Adelbert College and Western Reserve University in Cleveland, Ohio.  In 1899, as president of Western Reserve, he signed a petition to President William McKinley to mediate the conflict between Great Britain and the Transvaal and the Orange Free State. In 1909 was a member of the National Negro Committee, the precursor to the NAACP. He was an active supporter of the new NAACP from 1909 through at least 1929. He died on August 29, 1937.

Writings
He was the author of:  
 The Reading of Books (1883)
 The Family (1886; second edition, 1913), with Carrie F. Butler Thwing
 Within College Walls (1893)
 The College Woman (1894)
 College Administration (1900)
 God In His World (1900)
 History of Higher Education in America (1906)
 Education in the Far East (1909)
 A History of Education the United States since the Civil War (1910)
 Universities of the World (1911)
 Letters from a Father to his Son Entering College (1912)
 Letters from a Father to His Daughter Entering College (1913)
 The American College (1913)
 The College Gateway (1918)
 Human Australasia: Studies of Society and Education in Australia and New Zealand    (1923)
 Guides, Philosophers, and Friends Studies of College Men (1927)
 The College President (1929)
 The American and the German University: one Hundred Years of History (1928)
 American Society: Interpretations of Educational and Other Forces (1931)

External links

 
 
 
 More biographical information

Phillips Academy alumni
Harvard University alumni
American non-fiction writers
American educators
1853 births
1937 deaths
People from New Sharon, Maine
Burials at Lake View Cemetery, Cleveland
Presidents of Case Western Reserve University